Ailuracantha is a dubious extinct placoderm genus from the actinolepidae family. It was discovered in a layer of the Senni Beds near the Black Mountains in Wales, and it is represented by only one species: Ailuracantha dorsifelis.

Etymology

The generic name Ailuracantha comes from the Greek αἴλουρος (aílouros), meaning "cat", and ἄκανθος (akanthos), meaning "spine" or "thorn"; the type species dorsifelis comes from the Latin dorsum, meaning "back," and felis, also meaning "cat." Both specific and generic names are in reference to The Cat’s Back, a spur of the Black Mountains and the locality the holotype was recovered from.

Paleobiology
Ailuracantha is relatively standard for an actinolepid, possessing a small, slightly dorsoventrally flattened body with two proportionally large spines on its thoracic shield. Unlike other members of this taxonomic group, its pectoral spines possess a narrow under surface and deep mesial surface, possibly suggesting greater mobility in them than observed in its relatives. Its frontal region is ornamented with small, oval-shaped tubercles, which are extremely fine on its ventral side.

Ailuracantha was a freshwater fish that lived in floodplain regions. It was probably a benthopelagic predator that fed on small, soft-bodied invertebrates.

References

External links
Introduction to the Placodermi: Extinct Armored Fishes with Jaws. Waggoner, Ben (2000). Retrieved Aug 1, 2005

Placoderms
1999 in paleontology